Penryn (Washo: Pénwin) is a census-designated place in Placer County, California, in the United States. The community's ZIP code is 95663 and is in area codes 916 and 279. The population was 831 at the 2010 census.

History
What became Penryn began in late 1864 when a Welsh immigrant named Griffith Griffith established a granite quarry on quarter section of land leased from the Central Pacific Railroad.  A siding was completed on February 6, 1865, and the first load of cut stone was shipped less than a week later.  The quarry was open for business, but as yet, had no name.  The railroad, matter-of-factly, designated the siding "Griffith’s Granite Station", but Griffith had something else in mind.

Back home in North Wales, Griffith, like his father before him, worked in the Penrhyn Slate Quarry.  In Welsh, the word penrhyn translates to headland or promontory, which aptly described the seaport from which the Penrhyn Quarry took its name.  When it came to naming his new enterprise, the choice was obvious, but not the spelling.  To simplify things and avoid the inevitable misspellings that were likely to occur, on the evening of May 17, 1865, Griffith, after discussing the matter with Central Pacific legal counsel Edwin Bryant Crocker (known later for the Crocker Art Museum), agreed to drop the “h” from the original Welsh spelling and settled on the name, and spelling, we know today.  The following day, Griffith recorded this auspicious event in his diary: "Concluded last night with Judge Crocker to call this quarry Penryn."

The quarry now had a name, but not the town, because there was no town, just the granite works and a railroad siding.  Griffith's employees all lived in the immediate area, so there were plenty of people, but no businesses outside of what amounted to a small "company store" near the quarry.  The nearest supply centers of any consequence were Newcastle and Smithville, near present-day Loomis. Griffith's early ledgers record numerous transactions at both places.

It was in 1869 that Griffith's mercantile monopoly came to an end.  That year, a large frame building housing a railroad depot, store and saloon, went up on the West side of the Central Pacific mainline, just South of today's English Colony Way.  In time, other businesses followed, but this single event marked the beginnings of what would soon evolve into the town of Penryn.

From the beginning, there was never any doubt or debate as to what the new town would be called. However, most references, prior to 1870, generically applied the name “Griffith’s Quarry” or “Griffith’s Granite Quarry” to the area that included the small, embryonic village, which clearly indicates no name had yet been officially assigned to the place. That finally happened in May 1871, when Penryn was designated a voting precinct by the County of Placer. And the most official recognition of all came in June 1873 with the establishment of a U. S. Post Office.

By the mid-1870s Penryn was an established community with a fine new schoolhouse, a hotel, at least one blacksmith shop, two or three stores and an equal number of saloons. The granite works was going strong, at peak times employing over 200 men, and would continue so until Griffith Griffith's death in February 1889. It was then purchased by Griffith's nephew, David Griffith, and would continue to operate on a somewhat smaller scale, until the latter Griffith's death in 1918. By the mid-1890s however, fruit raising had edged-out granite quarrying as the area's leading industry.

It was David Griffith's daughter, Enid, the great-niece of Griffith Griffith, who left the quarry property to the people of the County of Placer when she died in 1976. In accordance with her wishes, the site of the Penryn Granite Works is now a 23-acre (93,000 m2) park. The former quarry office building, erected in 1877, now houses the Griffith Quarry Museum, staffed by volunteers and open on weekends from noon until 4:00 pm or by appointment. Griffith Quarry was added to the National Register of Historic Places in 1977, and is also California Historical Landmark number 885.

Penryn granite is noted for its beauty and strength. Mottled in more-or-less equally sized specks of black and white, it appears a medium-to-dark gray in color, at first glance, but takes on an almost bluish-gray hue when viewed in a subdued light or, when wet or polished. This unique stone can be seen in the foundations and walls of a number of California landmarks including The State Capital and the old U.S. Mint in San Francisco.

Joel Parker Whitney owned thousands of acres of land in the Penryn area in the late 19th century. In the early 1890s, about 1,000 California fan palms were planted along the boundaries of Whitney's Placer County Citrus Colony citrus farming venture, and many still stand along English Colony Road. These palm trees, otherwise out of place among the native Sierra foothill oak forest, are a signature of the area.

Geography
According to the United States Census Bureau, the CDP covers an area of 1.8 square miles (4.7 km), all of it land.

Demographics
The 2010 United States Census reported that Penryn had a population of 831. The racial makeup of Penryn was 718 (86.4%) White, 3 (0.4%) African American, 22 (2.6%) Native American, 32 (3.9%) Asian, 3 (0.4%) Pacific Islander, 27 (3.2%) from other races, and 26 (3.1%) from two or more races. Hispanic or Latino of any race were 79 persons (9.5%).

The Census reported that 831 people (100% of the population) lived in households, 0 (0%) lived in non-institutionalized group quarters, and 0 (0%) were institutionalized.

There were 310 households, out of which 100 (32.3%) had children under the age of 18 living in them, 198 (63.9%) were opposite-sex married couples living together, 27 (8.7%) had a female householder with no husband present, 6 (1.9%) had a male householder with no wife present.  There were 10 (3.2%) unmarried opposite-sex partnerships, and 2 (0.6%) same-sex married couples or partnerships. 65 households (21.0%) were made up of individuals, and 28 (9.0%) had someone living alone who was 65 years of age or older. The average household size was 2.68.  There were 231 families (74.5% of all households); the average family size was 3.14.

The population was spread out, with 187 people (22.5%) under the age of 18, 68 people (8.2%) aged 18 to 24, 175 people (21.1%) aged 25 to 44, 271 people (32.6%) aged 45 to 64, and 130 people (15.6%) who were 65 years of age or older.  The median age was 43.2 years. For every 100 females, there were 97.4 males.  For every 100 females age 18 and over, there were 98.8 males.

The homeowner vacancy rate was 2.0%; the rental vacancy rate was 11.6%.  696 people (83.8% of the population) lived in owner-occupied housing units and 135 people (16.2%) lived in rental housing units.

References

External links
 Griffith Quarry museum
 Penryn Granite Quarry Visit - Photographic Tour, on Stone Quarries and Beyond.
 Penryn School
 Penryn Heritage Palm Conservation Foundation

California Historical Landmarks
Census-designated places in Placer County, California
Census-designated places in California
1865 establishments in California